The Caves of Steel is a science fiction novel by American writer Isaac Asimov. It is a detective story and illustrates an idea Asimov advocated, that science fiction can be applied to any literary genre, rather than just being a limited genre in itself.

The book was first published as a serial in Galaxy magazine, from October to December 1953. A Doubleday hardcover followed in 1954.

At the time of writing, Asimov conceived of The Caves of Steel as completely distinct from his Foundation Trilogy, published a few years earlier. Decades later, however, Asimov linked them, making the time of Caves of Steel a much earlier part of an extensive future history leading up to the rise of the Galactic Empire, its fall and the rise of two Foundations to replace it – with the Robot R. Daneel Olivaw, introduced in Caves of Steel, turning out to have survived over tens of thousands of years and have played a key role in the eras of both the Empire and the Foundation(s).

Setup
Isaac Asimov introduces Elijah Baley and R. Daneel Olivaw, later his favorite protagonists. They live roughly three millennia in Earth's future, a time when hyperspace travel has been discovered and a few worlds relatively close to Earth have been colonized – fifty planets known as the "Spacer worlds". The Spacer worlds are rich, have low population density (average population of one hundred million each), and use robot labor heavily. Meanwhile, Earth is overpopulated with eight billion people, three times that of Asimov's 1950s, with strict rules against robots. In The Caves of Steel and its sequels (the first of which is The Naked Sun), Asimov paints a grim situation of an Earth dealing with an extremely large population and of luxury-seeking Spacers, who limit birth to permit great wealth and privacy.

Asimov was a claustrophile: "I wrote a novel in 1953 which pictured a world in which everyone lived in underground cities, comfortably enclosed away from the open air. People would say, 'How could you imagine such a nightmarish situation?' And I would answer in astonishment, 'What nightmarish situation? The "caves of steel" are vast city complexes covered by huge metallic domes, capable of supporting tens of millions each: the New York City of that era (wherein much of the story is set) encompasses present-day New York City as well as large tracts of New Jersey. Asimov imagines the present day underground transit connected to malls and apartment blocks, until no one ever exits the domes and most of the population suffer from extreme fear of leaving them. (Even though the Robot and Foundation series were not made part of the same fictional universe until much later, the "caves of steel" resemble the planet Trantor.)

The novel's central plot device is a murder, which takes place before it opens.  (This is an Asimov trademark, which he attributed to his squeamishness plus John Campbell's advice to begin as late in the story as possible.)  The victim is Roj Nemmenuh Sarton, a Spacer Ambassador who lives in Spacetown, the Spacer outpost just outside New York City. For some time, he has tried to convince the Earth government to loosen its anti-robot restrictions. One morning, he is discovered outside his home, his chest imploded by an energy blaster. The New York police commissioner charges Elijah with finding the murderer, in cooperation with a highly advanced robot named R. Daneel Olivaw who is visually identical to a human and is equipped with a scanner that is able to detect human emotions through their encephalographic waves.

Plot
A faction of Spacers have come to the realization that Spacer culture is effete, stagnating due to negative population growth and excessive longevity.  Their solution is to encourage further space exploration and colonization by Earthmen in concert with robots. However, Earthmen would first need to overcome their irrational antagonism toward robots. To this end, the faction have established habitations on Earth through which they hope to introduce humanoid robots to Earth.

New York City Police Commissioner Julius Enderby is secretly a member of the Medievalists, a subversive anti-robot group which pines for the 'olden days' where men did not live in the 'caves of steel'. He uses his position to engineer meetings with Spacer Dr. Sarton under the guise of further cooperation, but he actually intends to destroy R. Daneel - who lives with and resembles Dr. Sarton. Enderby orders R. Sammy to bring a blaster through the unmonitored 'open air' (something that no Earthman could countenance), but in the heat of the moment Enderby drops his glasses and fails to distinguish between the human and robot, accidentally shooting the human. Knowing that Baley's wife is also a Medievalist, he assigns Baley to the case, working with R. Daneel who represents the Spacers, and spreads a rumour about humanoid robots amongst the subversives to throw suspicion on Baley when Enderby later destroys R. Sammy with radiation. Daneel rules out Enderby as the murderer as his brain patterns show him incapable of deliberately killing.

The novel follows Baley and Olivaw as Baley begins to suspect Olivaw but is proved wrong twice. Olivaw gradually learns more about Earth humans and starts to display curiosity about aspects of human behaviour and Earth technology. As part of the investigation, Baley makes a visit to Spacetown where he meets with Dr. Fastolfe, who injects him with a mildly suggestive drug while speaking about the relative merits and shortcomings of Earth and Spacer society. Baley is converted to the cause of spreading humanity throughout the galaxy. Although the Spacers deem Baley inadequate to convert enough Earthmen, they find their target when Baley arrests Clousarr on suspicion of inciting a riot and Olivaw provides him with suggestive statements. Their job accomplished, the Spacers make plans to leave Earth as their continued presence would be to the detriment of their cause; they accept Dr. Sarton's unsolved death as a necessary sacrifice. This leaves Baley with ninety minutes to find the killer, which he is convinced will also clear him of the destruction of R. Sammy.

Baley has a flash of inspiration when he connects Enderby's emotional highs and lows to how close or far away Baley was to solving the murder. Obtaining a recording of the crime scene, he manages to demonstrate that fragments of Enderby's glasses remain in situ. Given that the Spacers have already accepted that Sarton's death is unsolved, they are willing to not prosecute Enderby for the accident if he agrees to work with them to promote colonization of other worlds amongst the Medievalists.

Another recurring theme is the tension between Baley's wife as "Jessie" or "Jezebel", and her resentment at Baley for explaining that the Biblical Jezebel story was misinterpreted, stifling her fantasy.

Characters
In order of appearance, described:

 Elijah "Lije" Baley, a plain-clothes police officer who works on Earth. He is called to solve the murder.
 Vince Barrett, a young man whose job was taken over by R. Sammy.
 R. Sammy, a robot assigned to the Police Department
 Julius Enderby, New York City's Commissioner of Police, who assigns Baley to the murder case.
 Jezebel "Jessie" Navodny Baley, Baley's wife
 Roj Nemennuh Sarton, a spacer roboticist murdered with a blaster. Baley is assigned to investigate his death.
 R. Daneel Olivaw, Baley's partner, a humaniform robot created in Sarton's likeness
 Bentley Baley, Baley's son
 Han Fastolfe, a roboticist from Aurora, a Spacer world, who believes Spacers and Earth dwellers must work together to colonize the galaxy and survive in the future.
 Dr. Anthony Gerrigel, a roboticist at Washington whom Baley calls
 Francis Clousarr, a New Yorker who was arrested for inciting a riot against robots two years ago. Daneel identifies him as being present at two incidents.

Reception
Reviewer Groff Conklin praised the novel for the way Asimov "combines his interest in robotics with his consuming preoccupation with the sociology of a technology-mad, bureaucratically tethered world of tomorrow." Boucher and McComas praised The Caves of Steel as "Asimov's best long work to date", saying that it was "the most successful attempt yet to combine" the detective and science fiction novel. P. Schuyler Miller called it "as honest a combination of science fiction and detection as we've seen." Villiers Gerson of The New York Times wrote: "Here is an unusually exciting and engrossing detective story set in a science fictional background convincingly worked out."

In 2004 The Caves of Steel was nominated for a retroactive Hugo Award for Best Novel for 1954.

Adaptations
The novel was adapted for television by the BBC and shown in 1964: only a few short excerpts still exist. In June 1989, the book was adapted by Bert Coules as a radio play for the BBC, with Ed Bishop as Elijah Baley and Sam Dastor as R. Daneel Olivaw. In 2016, Akiva Goldsman had been hired to produce a movie.

Television adaptation

An adaptation of The Caves of Steel was produced by the BBC and broadcast on BBC2 on 5 June 1964 as part of an anthology strand called Story Parade, which specialized in adaptations of modern novels. It starred Peter Cushing as Elijah Baley and John Carson as R. Daneel Olivaw. The adaptation was the brainchild of Story Parade story editor Irene Shubik, who was an enthusiast of science fiction, once describing him as "one of the most interesting and amusing men I have ever met". Shubik had previously devised and story edited the science fiction anthology series Out of This World, which had adapted Asimov's short story "Little Lost Robot" in 1962. The adaptation of the novel was handled by Terry Nation, who by now had created the Daleks for Doctor Who.

The screenplay was generally faithful to the plot of the novel. The only major deviation was the conclusion – in the television version the murderer commits suicide when he is unmasked, although in the novel he agrees to work to convince the Medievalists to change their ways. The other major change is that the roboticist Dr. Gerrigel is a female character in the television version.

The Caves of Steel garnered good reviews: The Daily Telegraph said the play "proved again that science fiction can be exciting, carry a message and be intellectually stimulating" while The Listener, citing the play as the best of the Story Parade series, described it as "a fascinating mixture of science fiction and whodunit which worked remarkably well". The play was repeated on BBC1 on 28 August 1964. As was common practice at the time, the master videotapes of The Caves of Steel were wiped some time after broadcast and the play remains missing. A few short extracts survive: the opening titles and the murder of Sarton; Elijah and Daneel meeting Dr. Gerrigel (Naomi Chance) and Elijah and Daneel confronting the Medievalist Clousarr (John Boyd-Brent).

The success of The Caves of Steel led Irene Shubik to devise the science fiction anthology series Out of the Unknown, during which she oversaw the adaptation of six more Asimov stories, including The Caves of Steels sequel The Naked Sun.

Cast of BBC 2 Adaptation:

 Peter Cushing as Elijah Baley
 John Carson as R Daneel Olivaw
 Kenneth J. Warren as Commissioner Julius Enderby
 John Wentworth as Dr Han Fastolfe
 Ellen McIntosh as Jessie Baley
 Ian Trigger as R Sammy
 Stanley Walsh as Simpson
 John Boyd-Brent as Francis Cloussar
 Naomi Chance as Dr Gerrigel
 Hennie Scott as Bentley Baley
 Richard Beale as Controller
 Richard Beint as Shop Manager
 Patsy Smart as Customer

Radio adaptation
In 1989 BBC Radio 4 broadcast an adaptation by Bert Coules, directed by Matthew Walters and starring Ed Bishop as Baley with Sam Dastor as Olivaw.

Cast of BBC Radio 4 Adaptation:

 Ed Bishop as Elijah Baley
 Sam Dastor as R Daneel Olivaw
 Matt Zimmerman as Commissioner Julius Enderby
 Christopher Good as Dr Han Fastolfe
 Beth Porter as Jessie Baley
 Ian Michie as R Sammy
 Vincent Brimble as Simpson
 Elizabeth Mansfield as Frances Cloussar
 Brian Miller as the Shopkeeper
 Boris Hunker as Bentley Baley
 Susan Sheridan as City Announcer

Game adaptation
In 1988 Kodak produced a VCR game entitled "Isaac Asimov's Robots" that contained a 45-minute film loosely based on The Caves of Steel. It featured many of the characters and settings from the novel, but an altered plotline to fit the needs of a VCR game. Elements from The Robots of Dawn (including the characters Giskard Reventlov and Kelden Amadiro) were incorporated, as well. Similar to the BBC2 version, Dr. Gerrigel was replaced by a woman, named Sophia Quintana (after an unrelated character from Robots and Empire).

Cast of Isaac Asimov's Robots:

 Valarie Pettiford as Newscaster
 Stephen Rowe as Elijah Baley
 Richard Levine as R. Sammy
 Larry Block as Commissioner Julius Enderby
 Brent Barrett as R. Daneel Olivaw
 John Henry Cox as Dr. Han Fastolfe
 Eric Tull as R. Giskard Reventlov and R. Borgraf
 George Merritt as Kelden Amadiro
 Darrie Lawrence as Sophia Quintana
 Debra Jo Rupp as R. Jane
 Eleni Kelakos as Vasilia Fastolfe

References

Sources

External links 
 
 
 
 The Caves of Steel as serialized in Galaxy, parts 1, 2, and 3 at the Internet Archive

1954 American novels
1954 science fiction novels
Foundation universe books
Mystery novels by Isaac Asimov
Science fiction novels by Isaac Asimov
BBC television dramas
American detective novels
Novels about mental health
Overpopulation fiction
American mystery novels
American science fiction novels
Novels first published in serial form
Works originally published in Galaxy Science Fiction
Doubleday (publisher) books